Bear Mountain is a mountain located in western Pennington County, South Dakota. It is the 3rd highest point in the Black Hills. There is a fire lookout tower on the summit.

References

Mountains of South Dakota
Landforms of Pennington County, South Dakota